Second Hand Wedding is a comedy film from New Zealand. It is written by Nick Ward and Linda Niccol and directed by Paul Murphy and was filmed on the Kapiti Coast.

Cast
Geraldine Brophy - Jill
Patrick Wilson - Brian
Holly Shanahan - Cheryl
Ryan O'Kane - Stew Davis
Tina Regtien - Muffy
John Rowles - Self

Reception
By mid-September 2008 it had grossed over $1.8 million which was at the time the highest grossing New Zealand film of the year.

Peter Galvin from SBS gave the film 2.5 stars writing "This is a fairytale, in 'dag’ vision. It's the kind of movie that begs to be cuddled, not questioned. It wants us to feel good because it's so kind. But kind can be tough, too, and beneath all that affection is a lot of cool calculation." Sydney Morning Herald's Jake Wilson gave it 2.5 stars, saying "this is possibly the daggiest film of the year." The Australian's Evan Williams gave it 2.5 stars writing Murphy has built an amiable, mild-mannered farce, notable for some engaging performances, including a full-blooded turn by Brophy as the golden-hearted but insufferable mother." In The Press Charlie Gates' 3 star review states "It is a cute, folksy comedy that is solidly and competently put together on a low budget and has enough heart to just about see it through."

Ben McEachen, writing in the Sunday Mail, gives it 1.5 stars. He says "Wanting to be New Zealand's answer to The Castle, this low-budget dud is devoid of the stuff you rightly expect of such modest foreign fare."

Awards
New Zealand Film and TV Awards 2008
Best Actress - Geraldine Brophy - Won
Best Supporting Actress - Holly Shanahan - Won
Achievement in Editing in Film - Michael Horton - Nominated
Achievement in Production Design in Film - Brad Mill - Nominated

References

External links

2008 films
New Zealand comedy films
2000s English-language films